The 37th Annual Daytime Emmy Awards were held on Sunday, June 27, 2010, at the Las Vegas Hilton, and were televised on CBS. The Daytime Entertainment Creative Arts Emmy Awards were presented two days earlier on June 25 at the Westin Bonaventure Hotel.

The televised ceremony was hosted by Regis Philbin, and the nominations were announced May 12, 2010, partially on The Early Show.

Nominations and winners
The following is a list of nominees, with winners in bold:

Lifetime Achievement Award
 Agnes Nixon

Special Tributes
 All My Children
 As the World Turns
 Dick Clark
 American Bandstand
 Daytime Gives Back, Feed The Children

References

Award shows by Associated Television International
037
Daytime Emmy Awards
Emmy Awards
Daytime Emmy
Daytime Emmy Awards 37